Koveyt Mahalleh (also Romanized as Koveyt Maḩalleh) is a village in Chehel Chay Rural District, in the Central District of Minudasht County, Golestan Province, Iran. At the 2006 census, its population was 652, in 141 families.

References 

Populated places in Minudasht County